In the Spirit is an album of spirituals performed by multi-instrumentalist Joe McPhee's Bluette, recorded in 1999 and released on the CIMP label.

Reception

AllMusic reviewer Steve Loewy states: "An important contribution to the discography of the spiritual, McPhee gives it a new perspective, but one that is entirely respectful of the tradition. Performed gracefully and tastefully, the group tastes free form without losing sight of the melodies". On All About Jazz, Derek Taylor wrote: "In a career stamped by a continuous string of transcendent recordings this is one of McPhee's best to date, a vital testament that lovingly embraces the indelible tradition of spirituals and expertly applies them to the setting of creative improvisation". In JazzTimes, Harvey Pekar suggested: "Maybe one more extroverted track would have helped the CD, which sometimes gets too subdued, but it's a fine effort nevertheless".

Track listing 
 "Deep River" (Traditional) – 9:32
 "People Get Ready" (Curtis Mayfield) – 12:01
 "God Bless the Child" (Billie Holiday, Arthur Herzog, Jr.) – 11:44
 "Birmingham Sunday/Come Sunday" (Joe McPhee/Duke Ellington) – 14:19
 "Astral Spirits" (Joe McPhee) – 8:32
 "Just a Closer Walk With Thee" (Traditional) – 7:23

Personnel 
Joe McPhee – tenor saxophone, soprano saxophone
Joe Giardullo – flute, bass clarinet, clarinet, soprano saxophone
Michael Bisio, Dominic Duval – bass

References 

Joe McPhee albums
1999 albums
CIMP albums